Lucio Bini (1908 – 1964) was an Italian psychiatrist and professor at the University of Rome La Sapienza, Italy. Together with Ugo Cerletti, a neurophysiologist and a psychiatrist, he researched and discovered the method of electroconvulsive therapy, a type of shock therapy for mental diseases.

References
Kalinowsky, LB: Lucio Bini (September 18, 1908 – 1964). Am J Psychiatry (1965) Apr;121:1041-2.

External Links
Lucio Bini Electroconvulsive Therapy Records from the Menninger Foundation Historic Psychiatry Collection available on Kansas Memory http://www.kansasmemory.org/item/223271

Italian neuroscientists
Academic staff of the Sapienza University of Rome
1908 births
1964 deaths
20th-century Italian inventors
Neurophysiologists
20th-century Italian physicians